Writing therapy is a form of expressive therapy that uses the act of writing and processing the written word as therapy. Writing therapy posits that writing one's feelings gradually eases feelings of emotional trauma. Writing therapeutically can take place individually or in a group and it can be administered in person with a therapist or remotely through mailing or the Internet.

The field of writing therapy includes many practitioners in a variety of settings. The therapy is usually administered by a therapist or counselor. Several interventions exist online. Writing group leaders also work in hospitals with patients dealing with mental and physical illnesses. In university departments they aid student self-awareness and self-development. When administered at a distance, it is useful for those who prefer to remain personally anonymous and are not ready to disclose their most private thoughts and anxieties in a face-to-face situation.

As with most forms of therapy, writing therapy is adapted and used to work with a wide range of psychoneurotic issues, including bereavement, desertion and abuse. Many of these interventions take the form of classes where clients write on specific themes chosen by their therapist or counsellor. Assignments may include writing unsent letters to selected individuals, alive or dead, followed by imagined replies from the recipient, or a dialogue with the recovering alcoholic's bottle of alcohol.

Research into the therapeutic action of writing

The expressive writing paradigm 

Expressive writing is a form of writing therapy developed primarily by James W. Pennebaker in the late 1980s.  The seminal expressive writing study instructed participants in the experimental group to write about a 'past trauma', expressing their very deepest thoughts and feelings surrounding it. In contrast, control participants were asked to write as objectively and factually as possible about neutral topics (e.g., a particular room or their plans for the day), without revealing their emotions or opinions. For both groups, the timescale was 15 minutes of continuous writing repeated over four consecutive days. It was also instructed that should a participant run out of things to write, they should go back to the beginning and repeat themselves, perhaps writing a little differently.

Typical writing instructions include:

For the next 4 days, I would like you to write your very deepest thoughts and feelings about the most traumatic experience of your entire life or an extremely important emotional issue that has affected you and your life. In your writing, I'd like you to really let go and explore your deepest emotions and thoughts. You might tie your topic to your relationships with others, including parents, lovers, friends, or relatives; to your past, your present or your future; or to who you have been, who you would like to be or who you are now. You may write about the same general issues or experiences on all days of writing or about different topics each day. All of your writing will be completely confidential.

Don't worry about spelling, grammar or sentence structure. The only rule is that once you begin writing, you continue until the time is up.

Several measurements were made before and after, but the most striking finding was that relative to the control group, the experimental group made significantly fewer visits to a physician in the following months. Although many report being upset by the writing experience, they also find it valuable and meaningful.

Pennebaker has either written or co-written over 130 articles on expressive writing. One of these suggested that expressive writing has the potential to actually 'boost' the immune system, perhaps explaining the reduction in physician visits. This was shown by measuring lymphocyte response to the foreign mitogens phytohaemagglutinin (PHA) and concanavalin A (ConA) just prior to and 6 weeks after writing. The significantly increased lymphocyte response led to speculation that expressive writing enhances immunocompetence. The results of a preliminary study of 40 people diagnosed with Major Depressive Disorder suggests that routinely engaging in expressive writing may be effective in reducing symptoms of depression.

Reception and criticism of Pennebaker's expressive writing theories 

Pennebaker's experiments have been widely replicated and validated. Following on from Pennebaker's original work, there has been a renewed interest in the therapeutic value of abreaction. This was first discussed by Josef Breuer and Freud in Studies on Hysteria but not much explored since. At the heart of Pennebaker's theory is the idea that actively inhibiting thoughts and feelings about traumatic events requires effort, serves as a cumulative stressor on the body, and is associated with increased physiological activity, obsessive thinking or ruminating about the event, and longer-term disease. However, as Baikie and Wilhelm note, the theory has intuitive appeal but mixed empirical support:

Studies have shown that expressive writing results in significant improvements in various biochemical markers of physical and immune functioning (Pennebaker et al, 1988; Esterling et al, 1994; Petrie et al, 1995; Booth et al, 1997). This suggests that written disclosure may reduce the physiological stress on the body caused by inhibition, although it does not necessarily mean that disinhibition is the causal mechanism underlying these biological effects. On the other hand, participants writing about previously undisclosed traumas showed no differences in health outcomes from those writing about previously disclosed traumas (Greenberg & Stone, 1992) and participants writing about imaginary traumas that they had not actually experienced, and therefore could not have inhibited, also demonstrated significant improvements in physical health (Greenberg et al, 1996). Therefore, although inhibition may play a part, the observed benefits of writing are not entirely due to reductions in inhibition.

In a 2013 article by Nazarian and Smyth, writing instructions for the expressive writing task were manipulated - in that 6 conditions were created - i.e.,  cognitive-processing, exposure, self-regulation, and benefit-finding, standard expressive writing and a control group. While salivary cortisol was measured for each condition, none of the conditions significantly influenced cortisol, but instructions did impact mood differentially depending on the condition. For example, the cognitive-processing as measured post-intervention were influenced not only by the cognitive processing instructions but also by exposure and benefit-finding. These results demonstrate a spillover effect from instructions to outcomes. In related research Travagin, Margola, Dennis and Revenson cognitive-processing instructions were compared to standard expressive writing for adolescents with peer problems and this research demonstrated better long-term social adjustment compared to standard expressive writing and greater increased positive affect for those adolescents who reported more peer problems than most.

Other theories related to writing therapy 

An additional line of enquiry, which has particular bearing on the difference between talking and writing, derives from Robert Ornstein's studies into the bicameral structure of the brain. While noting that what follows should be considered "wildly hypothetical", L'Abate, quoting Ornstein, postulates that:

Julie Gray, founder of Stories Without Borders notes that "People who have experienced trauma in their lives, whether or not they consider themselves writers, can benefit from creating narratives out of their stories. It is helpful to write it down, in other words, in safety and in non-judgment. Trauma can be quite isolating. Those who have suffered need to understand how they feel and also to try to communicate that to others."

Clinical implications of writing therapy 
Additional research since the 1980s has demonstrated that expressive writing may act as an agent to increase long-term health. Expressive writing can result in physiological, psychological, and biological outcomes, and is part of the emerging medical humanities field. Experiments demonstrate quantitative physiological readout such as changes in immune counts, blood pressure, in addition to qualitative readouts relating to psychiatric symptoms. Past attempts at implementing expressive writing interventions in clinical settings indicate that there are potential benefits for treatment plans. However, the specifics of such expressive writing procedures or protocols, and the populations most likely to benefit are not entirely clear.

Potential benefits of expressive writing 
One of the most important aspects of expressive writing used in therapy is the short-term, and long-term effects on the individuals participating. Karen Baikie and Kay Wilhelm go into a brief description of the effects people will have after completing a therapeutic expressive writing session.

The short-term effects after utilizing this form of therapy are usually a quick span of feeling distress or being in a negative mood. However, following up with clients after a longer amount of time to measure those effects finds evidence of many mental and physical health benefits.

These benefits include but are not limited to: “Reduced blood pressure, improved mood, reduced depressive symptoms, and fewer post-traumatic intrusion/avoidance symptoms.”

This study also showed that these positive long-term emotional outcomes correlated to positive physical outcomes such as: improved memory, improved performance at work, quicker re-employment and many more. While the short-term effects of this therapeutic practice may seem daunting, in reality they are just the steppingstones for individuals to begin a cycle of growth.

Potential benefits for cancer patients 
Illness and disease are experienced on multiple different fronts: biological, psychological, and social. Recent research has explored how narrative medicine and expressive writing, independently, may play a therapeutic role in chronic diseases such as cancer. Comparisons in practice have been made between expressive writing and psychotherapy. Similarly, practices such as: integrative, holistic, humanistic or complementary medicine have already been incorporated into the field. Expressive writing is self-administered with minimal prompting. With further research and refinement, it may be used as a more cost effective alternative to psychotherapy.

Recent experiments, systematic reviews, and meta-analyses examining the effects of expressive writing on ameliorating negative cancer symptoms yielded primarily non-significant initial results. However, analysis of sub-groups and moderating variables suggest that particular symptoms, or situations, may benefit some more than others with the implementation of an expressive writing intervention. For example, a review by Antoni and Dhabhar (2019) examined how psychosocial stress negatively impacts the immune response of patients with cancer. Even if an expressive writing intervention cannot directly impact cancer prognosis, it may play an important role in mediating factors such as chronic stress, trauma, depression, and anxiety.

Potential benefits for individuals recovering from addiction 
The impact of writing therapy for those struggling with addiction plays a significant role in their recovery treatment. Writing exercises – even simple ones such as poetry or stories – have the potential to improve those in addiction recovery the ability to cope with their conditions, and overall health.

The role of the distance therapies
With the accessibility provided by the Internet, the reach of the writing therapies has increased considerably, as clients and therapists can work together from anywhere in the world, provided they can write the same language. They simply "enter" into a private "chat room" and engage in an ongoing text dialogue in "real time". Participants can also receive therapy sessions via e-text and/or voice with video, and complete online questionnaires, handouts, workout sheets and similar exercises.

This requires the services of a counsellor or therapist, albeit sitting at a computer. Given the huge disjunction between the amount of mental illness compared with the paucity of skilled resources, new ways have been sought to provide therapy other than drugs. In the more advanced societies pressure for cost-effective treatments, supported by evidence-based results, has come from both insurance companies and government agencies. Hence the decline in long term intensive psychoanalysis and the rise of much briefer forms, such as cognitive therapy.

Via the Internet
Currently, the most widely used mode of Internet writing therapy is via e-mail (see analytic psychotherapist Nathan Field's paper "The Therapeutic Action of Writing in Self-Disclosure and Self-Expression"). It is asynchronous; i.e. messages are passed between therapist and client within an agreed time frame (for instance, one week), but at any time within that week. Where both parties remain anonymous the client benefits from the online disinhibition effect; that is to say, feels freer to disclose memories, thoughts and feelings that they might withhold in a face-to-face situation. Both client and therapist have time for reflecting on the past and recapturing forgotten memories, time for privately processing their reactions and giving thought to their own responses. With e-therapy, space is eliminated, and time expanded. Overall, it considerably reduces the amount of therapeutic input, as well as the speed and pressure that therapists habitually have to work under.

The anonymity and invisibility provides a therapeutic environment that comes much closer than classical analysis to Freud's ideal of the "analytic blank screen". Sitting behind the patient on the couch still leaves room for a multitude of clues to the analyst's individuality; e-therapy provides almost none. Whether distance and reciprocal anonymity reduces or increases the level of transference has yet to be investigated.

In a 2016 randomized controlled trial, expressive writing was tested against direction to an online support group for individuals with anxiety and depression. No difference between the groups was found. Both groups showed a moderate improvement over time, but of a magnitude comparable to what one would expect to see over the time period concerned without intervention.

Journalling

The oldest and most widely practiced form of self-help through writing is that of keeping a personal journal or diary—as distinct from a diary or calendar of daily appointments—in which the writer records their most meaningful thoughts and feelings. One individual benefit is that the act of writing puts a powerful brake on the torment of endlessly repeating troubled thoughts to which everyone is prone. Kathleen Adams states that through the act of journal writing, the writer is also able to "literally [read] his or her own mind" and thus "to perceive experiences more clearly and thus feels a relief of tension".

Self-concealment
Self-disclosure
Reflective writing

References

Further reading 

 
 
 

Psychotherapies
Writing